The Sexual Offences Act 1967 is an Act of Parliament in the United Kingdom (citation 1967 c. 60).  It legalised homosexual acts in England and Wales, on the condition that they were consensual, in private and between two men who had attained the age of 21. The law was extended to Scotland by the Criminal Justice (Scotland) Act 1980 and to Northern Ireland by the Homosexual Offences (Northern Ireland) Order 1982.

Background
Homosexual activity between men had been illegal for centuries. There was never an explicit ban on homosexual activity between women. In the 1950s, there was an increase of prosecutions against homosexual men and several well-known figures had been convicted. The government set up a committee led by John Wolfenden to consider the laws on homosexuality. In 1957, the committee published the Wolfenden report, which recommended the decriminalisation of homosexual activity between men above the age of 21. The position was summarised by the committee as follows: "unless a deliberate attempt be made by society through the agency of the law to equate the sphere of crime with that of sin, there must remain a realm of private that is in brief, not the law's business." However, the government of Harold Macmillan did not act upon its recommendations, due to fears of public backlash.

In 1965, several politicians sponsored a Sexual Offences Bill, a private member's bill which drew heavily upon the findings of the Wolfenden report. The key sponsors were Humphry Berkeley, a Conservative MP, Leo Abse, a Labour MP, and Lord Arran, a Conservative peer. By that year, public opinion had shifted in favour. A 1965 opinion poll commissioned by the Daily Mail found that 63% of respondents did not believe that homosexuality should be a crime while only 36% agreed it should, even though 93% agreed that homosexual men were "in need of medical or psychiatric treatment."

Legislation and debate
By 1965, a majority of MPs in the House of Commons were also sympathetic to changing the law. Berkeley's bill passed a second reading 164–107 in February 1966. Its passage was interrupted by the dissolution of Parliament for the 1966 general election. Berkeley lost his seat, but Labour's decisive victory increased the number of MPs who were likely to support the bill. Abse became the bill's main sponsor and he re-introduced the bill.

By 1967, the government of Harold Wilson was showing support for the bill. The decriminalisation of homosexuality was one of multiple liberal social reforms to be passed under Wilson's 1966-70 government and the wider move towards a "permissive society". Other reforms of the era included the legalisation of abortion the same year, the relaxation of divorce laws and the abolition of theatre censorship and capital punishment. These reforms arose due to several separate campaigns benefitting from growing public support and Labour's large majority, rather than from central government leadership. Wilson himself had no enthusiasm for moral legislation, but there were Labour frontbenchers who supported the bill, including Roy Jenkins, the Home Secretary.

The proposal legalised acts that met the conditions of being between two consenting adults in private. It did not apply to the Merchant Navy or the Armed Forces, nor to Scotland and Northern Ireland. In 1980, David Steel MP stated "I remember a conversation with the then sponsor of the Bill in 1965, Mr. Humphry Berkeley, in which I asked him why he proposed to cover only England and Wales. He was open about it. He said that the Bill was discussed on a Friday and that if he included Scotland in it most of the Scottish Members would stay to vote against it. Probably that was wise and sound judgment on his part." As with the Wolfenden report's proposal, the bill set the age of consent for homosexual activity to 21, five years higher than for heterosexual activity. It did not delete the offences of buggery and gross indecency. Men could still be prosecuted for these offences if their actions did not meet the strict requirements of the bill. For the first time, however, the maximum penalties were differentiated, depending upon why the relevant sexual act was still illegal: whether there was a lack of consent, the age requirement was not satisfied, or the act was not in private.

At the time, most proponents of the bill did not condone homosexuality, but instead argued that it was not within the responsibility of the criminal law to penalise homosexual men, who were already the object of ridicule and derision. Roy Jenkins captured the government's attitude: "those who suffer from this disability carry a great weight of shame all their lives" (quoted during parliamentary debate by The Times on 4 July 1967).

Both the major parties permitted a conscience vote. Labour and Liberal members were mostly in favour, while Conservative members were mostly opposed. The divide cut through party ranks, with Margaret Thatcher and Enoch Powell among the Conservative members voting in favour. The coalition in favour of the bill was later described as "a combination of Gaitskellites and future Thatcherites." The bill was also supported by the senior leaders of the Church of England, including Michael Ramsey, the Archbishop of Canterbury.

According to gay activist Peter Tatchell, dissent against the bill could be summed up by the Earl of Dudley's 16 June 1966 statement that "[homosexuals] are the most disgusting people in the world... Prison is much too good a place for them; in fact, that is a place where many of them like to go—for obvious reasons."

The Bill received royal assent on 27 July 1967 after an intense late night debate in the House of Commons.

Lord Arran, in an attempt to minimise criticisms that the legislation would lead to further public debate and visibility of issues relating to homosexual civil rights made the following qualification to this "historic" milestone: "I ask those [homosexuals] to show their thanks by comporting themselves quietly and with dignity… any form of ostentatious behaviour now or in the future or any form of public flaunting would be utterly distasteful… [And] make the sponsors of this bill regret that they had done what they had done"

Legacy
In BBC History, Florence Sutcliffe-Braithwaite wrote "This was a hugely important moment in the history of homosexuality in Britain — but it wasn't a moment of sudden liberation for gay men — and nor was it intended to be." One particularly important consequence was the increased freedom of assembly for gay rights groups, leading to an increase in gay rights activism in the 1970s. Conversely, there was a clampdown on the homosexual activities that were not protected by the law. In the decade after its passage, prosecutions for gross indecency involving males trebled.

No subsequent reconsideration of the issue of male homosexuality in statutory law took place in England and Wales until the late 1970s. In 1979, the Home Office Policy Advisory Committee's Working Party report Age of Consent in relation to Sexual Offences recommended that the age of consent for homosexual acts should be 18. This was rejected at the time, in part due to fears that further decriminalisation would serve only to encourage younger men to experiment sexually with other men, a choice that some at the time claimed would place such an individual outside of wider society.

The law was extended to Scotland in the Criminal Justice (Scotland) Act 1980, which took effect on 1 February 1981. As a result of the 1981 European Court of Human Rights case Dudgeon v. United Kingdom, the law was extended to Northern Ireland in the Homosexual Offences (Northern Ireland) Order 1982.

In 2020, a Freedom of Information request by journalists at The Mail on Sunday found that the Royal Mint Advisory Committee had rejected plans to issue a commemorative coin to mark the 50th anniversary of the passing of the act in 2015, concluding that it would not be "commercially viable" due to a perceived "lack of appeal" for the coin amongst collectors.

Amendments
The age of consent of 21 for homosexual males set by the 1967 Act was reduced to 18 by the Criminal Justice and Public Order Act 1994 after an attempt to equalise the age of consent with that of the heterosexual age of consent of 16 introduced as an amendment by the then Conservative MP Edwina Currie narrowly failed. This law also extended the definition of rape to include male rape; until then the latter had been prosecuted as buggery.
In 2000, the Parliament Acts 1911 and 1949 were invoked to ensure the passage of the Sexual Offences (Amendment) Act 2000, which equalised the age of consent to 16 for both homosexual and heterosexual behaviours throughout the UK.
The privacy restrictions of the law meant that while two men could have sex, a third person could not participate in the sex or even be present. These restrictions were held to be in breach of the European Convention on Human Rights by the European Court of Human Rights in 2000. The UK Government brought the law in England and Wales into compliance with that ruling by the Sexual Offences Act 2003, which omitted the privacy requirements relating to same-sex male sexual activity. (Sexual activity in a public lavatory was made a separate offence).
The Sexual Offences Act 2003, though subject to some controversy, overhauled the way sexual offences are dealt with by the police and courts, replacing provisions in the Sexual Offences Act 1956 as well as the 1967 Act. The offences of gross indecency and buggery were repealed from statutory law. As a result of the 2003 Act, the vast majority of the 1967 Act has been repealed.

See also

Sexual Offences Act
LGBT rights in the United Kingdom

Notes

References

Sources
Tatchell, P Europe in the Pink London: Gay Men's Press, 1995
The Times in Microfilm Facsimile Periodical Publications, London The Times 1967 (available in digital form via JISC)
Wolfenden, J (chair) The Report of the Committee on Homosexual Offences and Prostitution (cmnd 247) HMSO, 1958
 Coming out of the dark ages, Geraldine Bedell, The Observer, 24 June 2007
 Grey, Antony Quest for Justice, Sinclair-Stevenson, 1992

External links

In the House of Lords, the bill was discussed on 12 May 1965, 24 May, 21 June, in committee the same day, and on 10 May 1966, 23 May and 16 June. It received royal assent 21 July 1967 (links to Hansard).
50th anniversary of the 1967 Sexual Offences Act - UK Parliament - Living Heritage

United Kingdom Acts of Parliament 1967
LGBT law in the United Kingdom
Sex crimes in the United Kingdom
1967 in LGBT history
Gay history
July 1967 events in the United Kingdom